Chris Demetral (born 8 December 1969) is a Greek-American professional baseball player from Kalamazoo, Michigan who was the 31st round pick of the 1991 MLB Draft by the Los Angeles Dodgers. He played for multiple teams over an 11 year professional career. Demetral also competed in the 2004 Summer Olympics with Greece. He is currently the manager of the Greek National Baseball team.

References

1969 births
Living people
Greek baseball players
Olympic baseball players of Greece
Baseball players at the 2004 Summer Olympics
Sportspeople from Kalamazoo, Michigan